After the Iraq War in 2003, and even due to conflict before that, many Iraqis were forced to flee their country and settle elsewhere. Due to this reason, there are many Iraqi footballers living and playing abroad. Below is a list of young footballers of Iraqi origin who live elsewhere.

Players in bold are players that have been capped at any level for Iraq. Please also note that this is an incomplete list.

Iraq
These are the players that play in Iraq currently but started their careers elsewhere.

Albania

Australia

Belgium

Czech Republic

Denmark

England

France

Germany

Italy

Mexico

Norway

Netherlands

Qatar

Spain

Sweden

Switzerland

Turkey

United Arab Emirates

United States of America

References

Football in Iraq
 
Iraqi footballers
Iraqi expatriate footballers